The Albert Vinal House is a historic house located at 325 Harvard Street in Cambridge, Massachusetts.

Description and history 
The substantial Greek Revival house was built in 1853-1854 by Albert Vinal, a real estate developer and a dealer in lumber, wood, and coal. In addition to a fully pedimented gable, the house has wide corner pilasters, and several porches and porticos. The main entrance portico is particularly elaborate, and is topped by a bay window with an Italianate extended cornice with brackets.

The house was listed on the National Register of Historic Places on June 30, 1983.

See also
National Register of Historic Places listings in Cambridge, Massachusetts

References

Houses on the National Register of Historic Places in Cambridge, Massachusetts
Houses completed in 1854
Greek Revival houses in Massachusetts